Stark Raving Mad is an American sitcom television series that aired on NBC from September 23, 1999, to July 13, 2000. The series starred Tony Shalhoub and Neil Patrick Harris.

Synopsis
Shalhoub stars as odd horror novelist Ian Stark, who is obsessed with practical jokes, and whose first book Below Ground was a best seller. Neil Patrick Harris is Stark's reluctant editor Henry McNeeley, who has a variety of phobias and possibly obsessive–compulsive disorder.

On January 10, 2000, the sitcom won a People's Choice Award for Favorite New Television Comedy Series. The sitcom premiered on September 23, 1999, and was officially cancelled by NBC on April 15, 2000, despite being ranked 19th among all programs with an average of 15.5 million viewers, as it held poor retention rates from its lead-in, Frasier, and was consistently beaten by Who Wants to Be a Millionaire? in the same timeslot.

Cast

Main
Tony Shalhoub as Ian Stark
Neil Patrick Harris as Henry McNeeley
Eddie McClintock as Jake Donovan
Dorie Barton as Tess Farraday
Heather Paige Kent as Margaret 'Maddie' Keller (this role was originally to be played by Jessica Cauffiel who appeared in several early cast photos)

Recurring and Guest Stars
 Harriet Sansom Harris as Audrey
 Chris Sarandon as Cesar
 Dina Waters as Katherine 'Kit' Yate
Kellie Waymire as the other Tess, Tess Farraday's co-worker in the museum

Episodes

International airings
In some countries the series was renamed: Loco enloquecido (Latin America), Stark, loco de atar (Spain), Splitter Pine Gal (Norway), Kreisi kynäniekka (Finland) and "En förläggares mardröm" (Sweden).

References

External links
 TKtv info
 
 

1999 American television series debuts
2000 American television series endings
1990s American sitcoms
2000s American sitcoms
Television shows set in New York City
English-language television shows
NBC original programming
Television series by Steven Levitan Productions
Television series by 20th Century Fox Television
Television shows about writers